Iraq Campaign may refer to:

Iraq War, a war that lasted from 2003 to 2011
Iraq Campaign Medal